Itapiranga is the westernmost municipality in the Brazilian state of Santa Catarina.

Minority language 
Itapiranga was initially settled around 1920 by German speakers from what was known in German as the Altkolonie, or the eastern region of Rio Grande do Sul where immigrants from the Hunsrück and other regions of Germany had started to establish themselves starting in 1824. Therefore, the primary language in this area was Riograndenser Hunsrückisch for many years; however, since the 1960s the Portuguese language, Brazil's national language, has gained preference amongst most inhabitants. Itapiranga shares a similar history with many towns in the northwest of Rio Grande do Sul, where the same migratory patterns occurred. In the recent years there is an increasing effort to preserve the local minority Brazil's minority languages.

The Brazilian linguist Cléo Vilson Altenhofen was born and grew up in Harmonia, Rio Grande do Sul; he is a native speaker of Riograndenser Hunsrückisch. As such, he co-wrote together with linguist Jaqueline Frey, also a native speaker of this dialect and a native to Itapirange, Santa Catarina, and he personally delivered a historic speech before congress in Brasília, revindicating better minority language public policies for the country. Here is a section of that original text: In mein Gemeind in Itapiranga, Santa Catarina, hott’s eenfach net die Chance gebb, in de Schul Deitsch se lenne - ich menne hiemit Hochdeitsch ... (Translation: In my community in Itapiranga, Santa Catarina, there was no opportunity to learn German - by that I mean High German).

Notable people
Marciel Rodger Back, footballer

References 

Municipalities in Santa Catarina (state)
Populated places established in 1953